The eighth edition of the Men's Asian Amateur Boxing Championships was held from October 13–20, 1977 in Jakarta, Indonesia.

Medal summary

Medal table

References

External links
Asian Boxing Confederation

Asian Amateur Boxing Championships
Asian Boxing
Boxing